Bob Bryan and Mike Bryan were the defending champions but lost in the final to top seeds Max Mirnyi and Daniel Nestor, 6–3, 6–4.

Seeds

Draw

Finals

Top half

Bottom half

External links
 Main draw

2012 Aegon Championships